Solute carrier family 15 (H+/peptide transporter), member 2, also known as SLC15A2, is a human gene.

See also
 Solute carrier family

References

Further reading

Solute carrier family